Bodies is a British television medical drama produced by Hat Trick Productions for the BBC. Created by Jed Mercurio, the series first broadcast on 23 June 2004, and is based on Mercurio's book of the same name. The series is centred on specialist registrar Rob Lake (Max Beesley), who starts in a new post in the Obstetrics and gynaecology department at the fictional South Central Infirmary, under the guidance of consultant obstetrician Roger Hurley (Patrick Baladi).

The series differed from most other archetypal British hospital dramas, in that the surgical scenes were notable for their graphic nature, offering intimate detail of various procedures, and the operational complications dealt with in explicit detail. As a result, the themes were also often dark and depressing, including negligence, manipulation and death. Bodies has been described as a "dark, sometimes funny" take on a genre that had been made popular through shows such as Casualty and Holby City. In December 2009, The Times ranked Bodies in ninth place in its list of "Shows of the Decade", and in January 2010, The Guardian ranked Bodies number twenty of "The Greatest Television Dramas of All Time".

The first series was released on DVD on 30 October 2006. The second series, including the finale, was released on 26 December 2006. A complete box set was released on 9 April 2007. The show was made available via the BBC iPlayer service on 6 April 2019.

Broadcast
The first series started on BBC Three, as the channel was trying to break into hour-long dramas. BBC Two aired the series at the end of 2004. The channels co-commissioned a second series and increased the number of episodes to ten. The second series started in September 2005. The BBC did not order a third series, so a feature-length final episode was subsequently broadcast to conclude the programme in December 2006. The entire first and second series were also broadcast to American audiences on digital channel BBC America during 2005.
In 2022 Netflix began streaming the series in the UK.

Cast
 Max Beesley as Mr. Rob Lake
 Patrick Baladi as Mr. Roger Hurley
 Neve McIntosh as Sister Donna Rix
 Keith Allen as Mr. Tony Whitman
 Susan Lynch as Dr. Maria Orton
 Tamzin Malleson as Miss Polly Grey
 Preeya Kalidas as Dr. Maya Dutta
 Simon Lowe as Dr. Tim Sibley
 Hattie Morahan as Dr. Beth Lucas 
 Vicky Hall as Chrissy Farrell 
 Saskia Reeves as Ms. Mary Dodd
 Mary Stockley as Ms. Susannah Marshall

Episodes

Series 1 (2004)
Lake (Max Beesley) realises that despite his friendly, professional demeanour and strong academics, his boss, Hurley (Patrick Baladi), is an incompetent surgeon who regularly bungles surgical procedures, to the detriment of his patients. Hurley is, however, protected by the principle "Doctors look after doctors", a phrase often repeated throughout the series. Initially, Lake is also protected by this principle, when his involvement in a death of a patient is covered up, although this death haunts him. Initially, Lake seeks to become a whistleblower, after seeing Hurley's gross incompetence and negligence, particularly after he badly mishandles a birth in which an abruption occurs, leaving the mother with substantial brain damage. The anaesthetist for the operation, Dr. Maria Orton (Susan Lynch), makes an official complaint against Hurley, but her colleagues close ranks around him. The pregnant Dr. Orton is ostracised, and the stress of the situation causes her to miscarry. She is eventually sectioned and admitted to a psychiatric hospital. Pressure from outside authorities, hospital politics and blackmail from Hurley eventually forces Lake into silence. Unable to oust him yet forced to work with him, Lake soon seeks a way out and finds a post at another hospital. But Hurley, despite agreeing that he should move on, changes his mind, ruins Lake's chance to escape by informing his new employers of Lake's mistakes and his real reasons for wanting to leave. At the end of the season, Hurley is shown to be in line for promotion as the hospital's clinical director. Lake, trapped in his job, comes clean to the relatives of the patient whose death he caused, so that, in his own words, he may be judged. The series ends on this cliffhanger.

Series 2 (2005)
The series continues with the main overlying storyline of the constant struggle between Hurley and Lake. This season also saw the arrival of a new departmental manager, Chrissy Farrell (Vicky Hall). At the start of the second series, Lake is about to leave the hospital but, with no real job prospects elsewhere, he decides to remain. Lake and Hurley then begin to form a respectful professional relationship, with Lake turning a blind eye to Hurley's incompetence. Despite this, Donna Rix (Neve McIntosh), a nurse with whom Lake was having an affair, views Hurley's ineptitude with increasing alarm. She starts to voice her distress and sends anonymous letters to management in an attempt to bring wider attention to this issue. Lake, seeing this, pleads with Donna to act with restraint, claiming that Hurley will be brought down but not in this fashion. Towards the end of the series, Hurley's life begins to unravel. Attempts to have a third child are scuppered after he finds out he has a low sperm count and furthermore, is suspected of having an affair with a fellow doctor, soon leading to the breakdown of his marriage.

Finale (2006)

Awards and nominations

References

External links
 

Bodies at Hat Trick Productions
Bodies makeup special effects at MakeupSFX Ltd.

2004 British television series debuts
2006 British television series endings
2000s British drama television series
2000s British medical television series
BBC medical television shows
BBC television dramas
English-language television shows
Television series by Hat Trick Productions
Television shows set in West Yorkshire
2000s British workplace drama television series